Adauto Neto Calheira (born December 31, 1980) is a Brazilian soccer player.

Career

College and Amateur
Neto came from his native Brazil to the United States in 1999 to play college soccer at the University of Mobile. During his four years with the Rams he was a three-time NAIA Division 3 All-American.

During his college years Neto also briefly played with the Mid-Michigan Bucks in the Premier Development League.

Professional
Neto was drafted in the fourth round (44th overall) of the 2002 MLS SuperDraft by Dallas Burn, and featured in 4 regular season Major League Soccer games for the team in his debut season, before being released at the end of the season. He subsequently played for the Syracuse Salty Dogs and the Rochester Rhinos in the A-League.

Neto also has extensive indoor soccer experience, having spent seven years playing in the Major Indoor Soccer League and the Xtreme Soccer League with Cleveland Force, Baltimore Blast, the New Jersey Ironmen, and the Philadelphia KiXX. He was voted the 2004–05 MISL Most Valuable Player, won two MISL titles (both with the Blast), and helped bring the Ironmen within a single game of a championship in 2009.

After six years out of the professional outdoor game, Neto signed with Crystal Palace Baltimore of the USSF Division 2 Professional League prior to the 2010 season.

Club career statistics
(correct as of 1 October 2010)

References

Living people
1980 births
Brazilian footballers
Crystal Palace Baltimore players
Major Indoor Soccer League (2001–2008) players
Philadelphia KiXX players
University of Mobile alumni
Xtreme Soccer League players
New Jersey Ironmen players
USL Second Division players
Rochester New York FC players
FC Dallas players
Esporte Clube Vitória players
Major League Soccer players
USSF Division 2 Professional League players
Baltimore Blast (2008–2014 MISL) players
Major Indoor Soccer League (2008–2014) players
FC Dallas draft picks
Syracuse Salty Dogs players
A-League (1995–2004) players
Flint City Bucks players
USL League Two players
Association football midfielders
Cleveland Force (2002–2005 MISL) players
Harrisburg Heat (MASL) players